Nulkaba is a locality in the city of Cessnock, in the Hunter Region of New South Wales, Australia.

History
As early as 1829, land was set aside to build a church and school in the area now known as Nulkaba.  St. Luke's Anglican Church was built in 1872, and the first school in 1877.  "The Village of Pokolbin" was laid out in 1884–85, but was referred to as Cessnock, until that name came to be applied to what is now considered Cessnock, south of the village, and Nulkaba was used instead. The name of Nulkaba was officially adopted in 1927.

Education
Nulkaba Public School is located in Nulkaba at 5 O'Connors Road, and was opened in 1926. The school has just over 400 students, with exceptional academic and sporting results from the many children.

References

Suburbs of City of Cessnock